Herr Goeli (or Göli) was a Middle High German minnesinger. Four of his poems survive. They are found under his name only in the Codex Manesse. In three other manuscripts—the Weingarten Manuscript and the Berlin and Frankfurt Neidhart manuscripts—they are mistakenly attributed to Neidhart von Reuental. In fact, they are deliberate imitations of the village songs of Neidhart. They are of inferior quality. Their incipits are:

Svmer der hat sin gezelt
Willekomen svmer wetter svesse
Wol gezieret stat diu gruene heide
Wis willekomen nahtegal frowe

Goeli is usually identified with Diethelm Goeli, a knight of Basel recorded in various sources between 1254 and 1276. Diethelm's wife's name was Sibilia. He was probably dead by 1280.

Notes

Bibliography

1270s deaths
Musicians from Basel-Stadt
13th-century German poets
German male poets
Minnesingers